The Chaotian Palace (lit. "Palace of Heaven Veneration"), is located in Nanjing, China.  It was built as an imperial palace in the Ming dynasty, and today it is known as the Nanjing Municipal Museum. Chaotian Palace area has the largest preserved traditional Chinese architectural complex in Jiangnan.

Overview
The palace is a complex of buildings, in the center of which is the Wen Temple, which was built with precious materials, including yellow glazed tile was from Jingdezhen in Jiangxi province. It is a total of 70,000 square meters, consisting of three lines.

Within the palace are more than 100,000 cultural relics.

History
The site of the palace is located on Ye Mountain, once a place for metal casting in the ancient time of State of Wu in Zhou dynasty, named Ye Cheng, literally the city of metallurgy, the first name of the city of Nanjing. The Imperial Central University, at the time called Zongmingguan, was located there in Former Song dynasty. Chaotian Palace, or called Mingtian Palace, as a Taoist temple was originally named Ziji Palace built on the site of Zongmingguan in the era of Southern Wu, the Kingdom of Wu in the ending of Tang dynasty. It was rebuilt as Chaotian Palace by the Hongwu Emperor during the early Ming dynasty (in late 14th century). In Ming dynasty it was used primarily by members of the royalty for "veneration of ancestors".

The complex was burnt down during the Taiping Rebellion in Qing dynasty, and the present buildings were built from 1866 to 1870 when Nanking Academy (Jiangning Fuxue) moved to the site. During the ROC rule the place became Examination Yuan, Capital High Court, Ministry of Education (once named Tahsueh Yuan), as well as Palace Museum Nanjing Branch. In the PRC it became the Nanjing Municipal Museum.

Transportation
The palace is accessible within walking distance west of Zhangfuyuan station of Nanjing Metro Line 1. Chaotian Palace is located about 1000 meters southwest to Xinjiekou, the center of Nanjing, and about 800 meters east to Mochou Lake, hedged off by Qinhuai River and linked by Jianye Road Bridge.

Notes

External links

Official website 

Buildings and structures in Nanjing
Palaces in China
Royal residences in China
Ming dynasty architecture
Tourist attractions in Nanjing
Museums in Nanjing